Yellow line or Yellow Line may refer to:
 Yellow line (road marking)
 In the 1st & Ten (graphics system) graphics system, a depiction of the first down line on television broadcasts of football games

Transportation

The Americas 
 Yellow Line (Montreal Metro), Quebec, Canada
 Yellow Line (Rio de Janeiro), highway known in Portuguese as Linha Amarela
 Line 4 (São Paulo Metro), São Paulo, Brazil
 Yonge–University–Spadina line, Toronto Subway, Canada
 Millennium Line, Vancouver SkyTrain, Canada
 Yellow Line (CTA), Chicago, Illinois, US
 BMT Broadway Line in New York City, colored yellow, serving N, Q, R and W trains
 MAX Yellow Line, Portland, Oregon, US
 Yellow Line (Washington Metro), Washington, DC, US
 Yellow Line (Baltimore), Baltimore, Maryland, US
 , Bay Area Rapid Transit, San Francisco, California, US
 Gold Line (MARTA) in Atlanta, Georgia, originally called "Yellow Line"
 MBTA bus, sometimes referred to as the Yellow Line
 Mexico City Metro Line 5
 L Line (Los Angeles Metro), Los Angeles, California, US

Asia 
 Yellow Line (Bangkok), Bangkok, Thailand
 Yellow Line (Delhi Metro), Delhi, India
 Yellow line (Kaohsiung MRT), Kaohsiung, Taiwan
 Yellow Line (Namma Metro), Bangalore, India
 Yellow line (Taipei Metro), Taipei, Taiwan
 Bundang Line, Seoul, South Korea
 Circle MRT line, Singapore
 Daegu Metro Line 3, Daegu, South Korea
Loop Line of KRL Commuterline, Jakarta, Indonesia
 Line 3, Shanghai Metro, Shanghai, China
 Manila Light Rail Transit System Line 1,  known as Manila LRT Yellow Line, Manila, Philippines
 Tokyo Metro Yūrakuchō Line, Tokyo, Japan
 Yellow Bus Line, a large bus company in Mindanao

Europe 
 Barcelona Metro line 4, Spain
 Bucharest Metro Line M1, Bucharest, Romania
 M2 (Copenhagen), Denmark
 U4 (Berlin U-Bahn), Germany
 Line M3 - Milan Subway (Metropolitana di Milano), Italy
 Circle line (London Underground), United Kingdom
 Line 3 (Madrid Metro), Spain
 Tyne and Wear Metro of Newcastle upon Tyne, UK
 RER C, Paris, France
 Line B (Prague Metro), Czech Republic
 Sheffield Supertram Yellow Line, UK
 Kalininsko-Solntsevskaya line, Moscow, Russia
 Yellow Line (Lisbon Metro), one of the four lines of Lisbon Metro

Australia 
 North Shore & Western Line, Sydney, Australia

See also
 Gold Line (disambiguation)
 Orange Line (disambiguation)
 Yellow Green Line (disambiguation)
 Yellow Flag Line
 Yellow N Line
 Yellow Q Line
 Yellow R Line
 Yellow W Line